The 1987 FIBA Under-19 World Championship (Italian: 1987 Campionato del mondo FIBA Under 19) was the 3rd edition of the FIBA U19 World Championship. It was held in Bormio, Italy from 29 July to 5 August 1987. Yugoslavia won their first and only U19 championship representing Yugoslavia, after beating the defending champions United States 86–76 in the final. Toni Kukoč was named the tournament MVP.

Several players who played at the tournament have been inducted into the FIBA Hall of Fame, including Vlade Divac and Toni Kukoč, and coach Svetislav Pešić, while Gary Payton, Dino Rađa, Kukoč, and Divac are members of the Naismith Memorial Basketball Hall of Fame.

Venue

Qualification

Preliminary round

Group A

Matches

Group B

Matches

Final round

Classification 5th-12th

5–8th place bracket

5th-8th Semifinals

9–12th place bracket

9th-12th Semifinals

11th place game

9th place game

7th place game

5th place game

Semifinals

Source: FIBA Archive

Bronze medal match

Final

Final standings

Source: FIBA Archive

Medal rosters
  4 Zoran Kalpić, 5 Luka Pavićević, 6 Nebojša Ilić, 7 Toni Kukoč, 8 Miroslav Pecarski, 9 Teoman Alibegović, 10 Aleksandar Đorđević, 11 Samir Avdić, 12 Vlade Divac, 13 Radenko Dobraš, 14 Dino Rađa, 15 Slaviša Koprivica (Head coach: Svetislav Pešić)

  4 Kevin Pritchard, 5 Larry Johnson, 6 Gary Payton, 7 Stephen Thompson, 8 LaBradford Smith, 9 Lionel Simmons, 10 Scott Williams, 11 Stacey Augmon, 12 Robert Brickey, 13 Ron Huery, 14 Dwayne Schintzius, 15 Brian Williams (Head coach: Larry Brown)

  4 Sandro Brusamarello, 5 Nando Gentile, 6 Riccardo Pittis, 7 Massimiliano Aldi, 8 Stefano Rusconi, 9 Andrea Niccolai, 10 Michele Zeno, 11 Davide Pessina, 12 Alberto Ballestra, 13 Gustavo Tolloti, 14 Giovanni Savio, 15 Genaro Palmieri (Head coach: ?)

Awards

References

External links
 FIBA Basketball Archive

1987
1987 in basketball
International youth basketball competitions hosted by Italy
1987–88 in Italian basketball
July 1987 sports events in Europe
August 1987 sports events in Europe